The 1974–75 Philadelphia Flyers season was the Philadelphia Flyers eighth season in the National Hockey League (NHL). The Flyers repeated as Stanley Cup champions. The 1974–75 Flyers were the last Stanley Cup champion to be composed entirely of Canadian-born players.

Regular season
In 1974–75, Dave Schultz topped his mark from the previous season by setting an NHL record for penalty minutes (472 in all). Bobby Clarke's efforts earned him his second Hart Trophy and Bernie Parent was the lone recipient of the Vezina Trophy. The Flyers as a team improved their record slightly with a mark of 51–18–11, the best record in the league.

Season standings

Playoffs
After a first-round bye, the Flyers easily swept the Toronto Maple Leafs and were presented with another New York-area team in the semifinals. The Flyers looked to be headed toward another sweep against the New York Islanders after winning the first three games. The Islanders, however, fought back by winning the next three games, setting up a deciding seventh game. The Flyers were finally able to shut the door on the Islanders, winning Game 7, 4–1.

Facing the Buffalo Sabres in the Stanley Cup Finals, the Flyers won the first two games at home. Game 3, played in Buffalo, would go down in hockey lore as "The Fog Game" due to an unusual May heat wave in Buffalo which forced parts of the game to be played in heavy fog, as Buffalo's arena lacked air conditioning. The Flyers lost Games 3 and 4, but won Game 5 at home in dominating fashion, 5–1. On the road for Game 6, Bob Kelly scored the decisive goal and Parent posted another shutout (his fourth of the playoffs) as the Flyers repeated as Stanley Cup champions. Parent also repeated as the playoff MVP, winning his second consecutive Conn Smythe Trophy.

Schedule and results

Regular season

|- style="background:#fcf;"
| 1 || October 10 || Los Angeles || 5–3 || Philadelphia || Parent || 17,007 || 0–1–0 || 0 || 
|- style="background:#cfc;"
| 2 || October 12 || Buffalo || 1–6 || Philadelphia || Parent || 17,007 || 1–1–0 || 2 || 
|- style="background:#cfc;"
| 3 || October 13 || Kansas City || 2–3 || Philadelphia || Stephenson || 17,007 || 2–1–0 || 4 || 
|- style="background:#fcf;"
| 4 || October 17 || Boston || 4–1 || Philadelphia || Parent || 17,007 || 2–2–0 || 4 || 
|- style="background:#cfc;"
| 5 || October 19 || Philadelphia || 6–3 || Pittsburgh || Stephenson || 13,404 || 3–2–0 || 6 || 
|- style="background:#ffc;"
| 6 || October 20 || Montreal || 2–2 || Philadelphia || Parent || 17,007 || 3–2–1 || 7 || 
|- style="background:#cfc;"
| 7 || October 22 || Philadelphia || 4–2 || Los Angeles || Parent || 13,558 || 4–2–1 || 9 || 
|- style="background:#fcf;"
| 8 || October 25 || Philadelphia || 1–4 || California || Taylor || 12,398 || 4–3–1 || 9 || 
|- style="background:#cfc;"
| 9 || October 26 || Philadelphia || 3–2 || Vancouver || Parent || 15,570 || 5–3–1 || 11 || 
|- style="background:#cfc;"
| 10 || October 31 || NY Rangers || 1–5 || Philadelphia || Parent || 17,007 || 6–3–1 || 13 || 
|-

|- style="background:#cfc;"
| 11 || November 2 || Philadelphia || 3–0 || Montreal || Parent || 18,005 || 7–3–1 || 15 || 
|- style="background:#cfc;"
| 12 || November 3 || NY Islanders || 1–3 || Philadelphia || Parent || 17,007 || 8–3–1 || 17 || 
|- style="background:#ffc;"
| 13 || November 5 || Philadelphia || 4–4 || NY Islanders || Parent || 14,865 || 8–3–2 || 18 || 
|- style="background:#cfc;"
| 14 || November 7 || Minnesota || 0–2 || Philadelphia || Parent || 17,007 || 9–3–2 || 20 || 
|- style="background:#cfc;"
| 15 || November 9 || Washington || 2–6 || Philadelphia || Stephenson || 17,007 || 10–3–2 || 22 || 
|- style="background:#cfc;"
| 16 || November 10 || California || 0–3 || Philadelphia || Parent || 17,007 || 11–3–2 || 24 || 
|- style="background:#cfc;"
| 17 || November 13 || Philadelphia || 3–2 || NY Rangers || Parent || 17,500 || 12–3–2 || 26 || 
|- style="background:#ffc;"
| 18 || November 15 || Philadelphia || 2–2 || Atlanta || Parent || 15,141 || 12–3–3 || 27 || 
|- style="background:#fcf;"
| 19 || November 16 || Philadelphia || 3–5 || St. Louis || Stephenson || 18,607 || 12–4–3 || 27 || 
|- style="background:#fcf;"
| 20 || November 21 || Vancouver || 4–3 || Philadelphia || Parent || 17,007 || 12–5–3 || 27 || 
|- style="background:#cfc;"
| 21 || November 23 || Philadelphia || 6–3 || Toronto || Parent || 16,485 || 13–5–3 || 29 || 
|- style="background:#fcf;"
| 22 || November 24 || Atlanta || 4–3 || Philadelphia || Parent || 17,007 || 13–6–3 || 29 || 
|- style="background:#cfc;"
| 23 || November 27 || Detroit || 2–6 || Philadelphia || Parent || 17,007 || 14–6–3 || 31 || 
|-

|- style="background:#cfc;"
| 24 || December 1 || Kansas City || 0–10 || Philadelphia || Parent || 17,007 || 15–6–3 || 33 || 
|- style="background:#cfc;"
| 25 || December 5 || Chicago || 2–3 || Philadelphia || Parent || 17,007 || 16–6–3 || 35 || 
|- style="background:#ffc;"
| 26 || December 6 || Philadelphia || 3–3 || Kansas City || Parent || 8,971 || 16–6–4 || 36 || 
|- style="background:#cfc;"
| 27 || December 8 || NY Islanders || 2–3 || Philadelphia || Parent || 17,007 || 17–6–4 || 38 || 
|- style="background:#cfc;"
| 28 || December 12 || Minnesota || 0–6 || Philadelphia || Parent || 17,007 || 18–6–4 || 40 || 
|- style="background:#cfc;"
| 29 || December 13 || Philadelphia || 3–2 || Atlanta || Parent || 15,141 || 19–6–4 || 42 || 
|- style="background:#cfc;"
| 30 || December 15 || St. Louis || 2–7 || Philadelphia || Parent || 17,007 || 20–6–4 || 44 || 
|- style="background:#cfc;"
| 31 || December 19 || Toronto || 1–5 || Philadelphia || Parent || 17,007 || 21–6–4 || 46 || 
|- style="background:#ffc;"
| 32 || December 21 || Philadelphia || 2–2 || Detroit || Stephenson || 14,393 || 21–6–5 || 47 || 
|- style="background:#cfc;"
| 33 || December 22 || Pittsburgh || 0–4 || Philadelphia || Parent || 17,007 || 22–6–5 || 49 || 
|- style="background:#cfc;"
| 34 || December 26 || Philadelphia || 4–1 || Washington || Parent || 18,130 || 23–6–5 || 51 || 
|- style="background:#fcf;"
| 35 || December 28 || Philadelphia || 1–2 || Chicago || Parent || 19,000 || 23–7–5 || 51 || 
|- style="background:#cfc;"
| 36 || December 29 || Philadelphia || 5–2 || Buffalo || Parent || 15,863 || 24–7–5 || 53 || 
|-

|- style="background:#cfc;"
| 37 || January 1 || Philadelphia || 2–0 || Vancouver || Parent || 15,578 || 25–7–5 || 55 || 
|- style="background:#ffc;"
| 38 || January 4 || Philadelphia || 2–2 || Los Angeles || Parent || 16,005 || 25–7–6 || 56 || 
|- style="background:#fcf;"
| 39 || January 5 || Philadelphia || 1–5 || California || Parent || 11,153 || 25–8–6 || 56 || 
|- style="background:#fcf;"
| 40 || January 9 || NY Islanders || 3–1 || Philadelphia || Parent || 17,007 || 25–9–6 || 56 || 
|- style="background:#fcf;"
| 41 || January 11 || Philadelphia || 0–6 || Montreal || Parent || 18,721 || 25–10–6 || 56 || 
|- style="background:#cfc;"
| 42 || January 12 || California || 1–2 || Philadelphia || Parent || 17,007 || 26–10–6 || 58 || 
|- style="background:#cfc;"
| 43 || January 14 || Philadelphia || 6–4 || Kansas City || Parent || 8,057 || 27–10–6 || 60 || 
|- style="background:#cfc;"
| 44 || January 16 || Washington || 0–4 || Philadelphia || Parent || 17,007 || 28–10–6 || 62 || 
|- style="background:#cfc;"
| 45 || January 18 || Atlanta || 1–4 || Philadelphia || Parent || 17,007 || 29–10–6 || 64 || 
|- style="background:#cfc;"
| 46 || January 23 || Philadelphia || 7–2 || St. Louis || Parent || 18,022 || 30–10–6 || 66 || 
|- style="background:#ffc;"
| 47 || January 26 || Philadelphia || 2–2 || Boston || Parent || 15,003 || 30–10–7 || 67 || 
|- style="background:#cfc;"
| 48 || January 30 || Toronto || 1–3 || Philadelphia || Parent || 17,007 || 31–10–7 || 69 || 
|-

|- style="background:#cfc;"
| 49 || February 1 || Buffalo || 0–6 || Philadelphia || Parent || 17,007 || 32–10–7 || 71 || 
|- style="background:#fcf;"
| 50 || February 2 || Philadelphia || 1–5 || Boston || Parent || 15,003 || 32–11–7 || 71 || 
|- style="background:#cfc;"
| 51 || February 5 || Philadelphia || 4–3 || NY Rangers || Parent || 17,500 || 33–11–7 || 73 || 
|- style="background:#fcf;"
| 52 || February 6 || NY Rangers || 3–1 || Philadelphia || Parent || 17,007 || 33–12–7 || 73 || 
|- style="background:#fcf;"
| 53 || February 8 || Philadelphia || 0–5 || Minnesota || Stephenson || 15,230 || 33–13–7 || 73 || 
|- style="background:#fcf;"
| 54 || February 11 || Philadelphia || 1–3 || St. Louis || Parent || 17,924 || 33–14–7 || 73 || 
|- style="background:#cfc;"
| 55 || February 13 || Chicago || 1–4 || Philadelphia || Parent || 17,007 || 34–14–7 || 75 || 
|- style="background:#ffc;"
| 56 || February 15 ||Philadelphia || 1–1 || NY Islanders || Parent || 14,865 || 34–14–8 || 76 || 
|- style="background:#cfc;"
| 57 || February 16 || Boston || 3–4 || Philadelphia || Parent || 17,007 || 35–14–8 || 78 || 
|- style="background:#fcf;"
| 58 || February 19 || Philadelphia || 3–4 || Detroit || Parent || 14,150 || 35–15–8 || 78 || 
|- style="background:#ffc;"
| 59 || February 20 || Philadelphia || 6–6 || Buffalo || Parent || 15,863 || 35–15–9 || 79 || 
|- style="background:#fcf;"
| 60 || February 23 || Philadelphia || 1–2 || NY Rangers || Parent || 17,500 || 35–16–9 || 79 || 
|- style="background:#fcf;"
| 61 || February 26 || Philadelphia || 4–7 || Atlanta || Parent || 15,087 || 35–17–9 || 79 || 
|- style="background:#cfc;"
| 62 || February 27 || Vancouver || 1–3 || Philadelphia || Parent || 17,007 || 36–17–9 || 81 || 
|-

|- style="background:#cfc;"
| 63 || March 1 || Kansas City || 0–3 || Philadelphia || Stephenson || 17,007 || 37–17–9 || 83 || 
|- style="background:#cfc;"
| 64 || March 2 || St. Louis || 2–4 || Philadelphia || Stephenson || 17,007 || 38–17–9 || 85 || 
|- style="background:#cfc;"
| 65 || March 5 || Philadelphia || 9–2 || Minnesota || Stephenson || 14,587 || 39–17–9 || 87 || 
|- style="background:#fcf;"
| 66 || March 8 || Philadelphia || 2–8 || Pittsburgh || Taylor || 13,404 || 39–18–9 || 87 || 
|- style="background:#cfc;"
| 67 || March 9 || Detroit || 5–8 || Philadelphia || Stephenson || 17,007 || 40–18–9 || 89 || 
|- style="background:#cfc;"
| 68 || March 13 || Pittsburgh || 0–6 || Philadelphia || Parent || 17,007 || 41–18–9 || 91 || 
|- style="background:#ffc;"
| 69 || March 15 || Philadelphia || 4–4 || Toronto || Taylor || 16,485 || 41–18–10 || 92 || 
|- style="background:#cfc;"
| 70 || March 16 || Los Angeles || 0–3 || Philadelphia || Parent || 17,007 || 42–18–10 || 94 || 
|- style="background:#cfc;"
| 71 || March 18 || Philadelphia || 7–2 || Washington || Parent || 18,130 || 43–18–10 || 96 || 
|- style="background:#cfc;"
| 72 || March 22 || Minnesota || 0–4 || Philadelphia || Parent || 17,007 || 44–18–10 || 98 || 
|- style="background:#cfc;"
| 73 || March 23 || Montreal || 1–2 || Philadelphia || Parent || 17,007 || 45–18–10 || 100 || 
|- style="background:#cfc;"
| 74 || March 25 || Philadelphia || 5–3 || Vancouver || Parent || 15,570 || 46–18–10 || 102 || 
|- style="background:#cfc;"
| 75 || March 26 || Philadelphia || 6–2 || California || Parent || 11,068 || 47–18–10 || 104 || 
|- style="background:#cfc;"
| 76 || March 29 || Philadelphia || 5–2 || Chicago || Parent || 18,000 || 48–18–10 || 106 || 
|- style="background:#cfc;"
| 77 || March 30 || Chicago || 1–4 || Philadelphia || Parent || 17,007 || 49–18–10 || 108 || 
|-

|- style="background:#ffc;"
| 78 || April 3 || NY Rangers || 1–1 || Philadelphia || Parent || 17,007 || 49–18–11 || 109 || 
|- style="background:#cfc;"
| 79 || April 5 || Philadelphia || 4–1 || NY Islanders || Parent || 14,865 || 50–18–11 || 111 || 
|- style="background:#cfc;"
| 80 || April 6 || Atlanta || 2–6 || Philadelphia || Parent || 17,007 || 51–18–11 || 113 || 
|-

|-
| Legend:

Playoffs

|- style="background:#cfc;"
| 1 || April 13 || Toronto || 3–6 || Philadelphia ||  || Parent || 17,077 || Flyers lead 1–0 || 
|- style="background:#cfc;"
| 2 || April 15 || Toronto || 0–3 || Philadelphia ||  || Parent || 17,077  || Flyers lead 2–0 || 
|- style="background:#cfc;"
| 3 || April 17 || Philadelphia || 2–0 || Toronto || || Parent || 16,485 || Flyers lead 3–0 || 
|- style="background:#cfc;"
| 4 || April 19 || Philadelphia || 4–3 || Toronto || OT || Parent || 16,485 || Flyers win 4–0 || 
|-

|- style="background:#cfc;"
| 1 || April 29 || NY Islanders || 0–4 || Philadelphia || || Stephenson || 17,077 || Flyers lead 1–0 || 
|- style="background:#cfc;"
| 2 || May 1 || NY Islanders || 4–5 || Philadelphia || OT || Stephenson || 17,077  || Flyers lead 2–0 || 
|- style="background:#cfc;"
| 3 || May 4 || Philadelphia || 1–0 || NY Islanders || || Parent || 14,865 || Flyers lead 3–0 || 
|- style="background:#fcf;"
| 4 || May 7 || Philadelphia || 3–4 || NY Islanders || OT || Parent || 14,865 || Flyers lead 3–1 || 
|- style="background:#fcf;"
| 5 || May 8 || NY Islanders || 5–1 || Philadelphia || || Parent || 17,077 || Flyers lead 3–2 || 
|- style="background:#fcf;"
| 6 || May 11 || Philadelphia || 1–2 || NY Islanders || || Parent || 14,865 || Series tied 3–3 || 
|- style="background:#cfc;"
| 7 || May 13 || NY Islanders || 1–4 || Philadelphia || || Parent || 17,077 || Flyers win 4–3 || 
|-

|- style="background:#cfc;"
| 1 || May 15 || Buffalo || 1–4 || Philadelphia ||  || Parent || 17,077 || Flyers lead 1–0 || 
|- style="background:#cfc;"
| 2 || May 18 || Buffalo || 1–2 || Philadelphia || || Parent || 17,077  || Flyers lead 2–0 || 
|- style="background:#fcf;"
| 3 || May 20 || Philadelphia || 4–5 || Buffalo || OT || Parent || 15,863 || Flyers lead 2–1 || 
|- style="background:#fcf;"
| 4 || May 22 || Philadelphia || 2–4 || Buffalo || || Parent || 15,863 || Series tied 2–2 || 
|- style="background:#cfc;"
| 5 || May 25 || Buffalo || 1–5 || Philadelphia || || Parent || 17,077 || Flyers lead 3–2 || 
|- style="background:#cfc;"
| 6 || May 27 || Philadelphia || 2–0 || Buffalo || || Parent || 15,863 || Flyers win 4–2 || 
|-

|-
| Legend:

Player statistics

Scoring
 Position abbreviations: C = Center; D = Defense; G = Goaltender; LW = Left Wing; RW = Right Wing

Goaltending

Awards and records

Awards

Records

Among the team records set during the 1974–75 season was Bobby Clarke’s 18-game point streak from February 26 to April 3, which was later tied by Eric Lindros during the 1998–99 season. Clarke’s 89 assists on the season set a franchise high that he replicated in 1975–76. Goaltender Bernie Parent’s 12 shutouts tied his mark from the previous season and enforcer Dave Schultz’s 472 penalty minutes set a still-standing single season NHL record.

Two franchise winning streaks were set during the playoffs. The final win of an eight-game winning streak dating back to May 19, 1974, occurred on May 4. Likewise, the final win of an 13-game home winning streak dating back to April 9, 1974, occurred on May 1. Rick MacLeish scored a franchise record two hat tricks in the playoffs and Parent recorded four shutouts during the playoffs. The team as a whole had five shutouts during the playoffs, a mark which was later tied by the 2009–10 team.

Milestones

Transactions
The Flyers were involved in the following transactions from May 20, 1974, the day after the deciding game of the 1974 Stanley Cup Finals, through May 27, 1975, the day of the deciding game of the 1975 Stanley Cup Finals.

Trades

Players acquired

Players lost

Signings

Draft picks

Philadelphia's picks at the 1974 NHL amateur draft, which was held via conference call at the NHL's office in Montreal, Quebec, on May 28, 1974. The Flyers first-round pick, 17th overall, was traded to the California Golden Seals along with Al MacAdam and Larry Wright for Reggie Leach on May 24, 1974.

Farm teams
The Flyers were affiliated with the Richmond Robins of the AHL and the Philadelphia Firebirds of the NAHL. The Flyers and the expansion Washington Capitals had a joint affiliation agreement with Richmond and both teams sent players there. Richmond finished 2nd in their division and lost in seven games to the Hershey Bears in the first round of the playoffs. Playing in the Pennsylvania Convention Center, the first-year Firebirds finished 2nd in the league but lost in the first round of the playoffs to the Long Island Cougars.

Notes

References
General
 
 
 
Specific

Philadelphia Flyers seasons
Philadelphia
Philadelphia
Patrick Division champion seasons
Stanley Cup championship seasons
Western Conference (NHL) championship seasons
Philad
Philad